Anushree Das is a Bengali film and television actress. She started her career acting in films and later switched to Bengali TV soap opera.

Career
She started playing lead actress roles in the films Bourani directed by Bhabesh Kundu in 1991 and as the lead character Rupban in Rupban Kanya in 1992. She is highly acclaimed for her work in Bhai Amar Bhai (1996) and Praner Cheye Priyo (1998).

Then she started her career as a television actress with Zee Bangla's Khela and is mostly seen in serials of Magic Moments Motion Pictures.

Filmography
Bourani (1991)
Rupban Kanya (1992)
Biswas Abiswas (1994)
Amodini (1994)
Naga Jyoti (1994)
Abooz Mon (1996)
Bhai Amar Bhai (1996)
Bakul Priya (1997)
Ram Laxman (1997) - Odia film
Singha Bahini (1998) - Odia film 
Praner Cheye Priyo (1998)
Swamir Aadesh (1998)
8:08 Er Bongaon Local (2012)

Television

References

External links 
 

Living people
Bengali actresses
Year of birth missing (living people)